Crab on its Back is an oil painting by Vincent van Gogh. It is a still life of a crab lying on its back with a green background. The Van Gogh Museum dates the work to August–September 1887, while other sources date it to early 1889. The painting is in the permanent collection of the Van Gogh Museum in Amsterdam in the Netherlands.

The painting is possibly inspired by a Japanese print of a crab by Hokusai that Van Gogh had seen in the magazine Le Japon Artistique, which his brother Theo van Gogh had sent him in September 1888.

Related work 
Van Gogh also painted Two Crabs (1889), a still life with two crabs one of which is lying on its back, on display in the National Gallery in London.

References

External links 

1888 paintings
Paintings by Vincent van Gogh
Collections of the Van Gogh Museum
Crustaceans in art
Still life paintings